Aatreya may refer to:

 Acharya Aatreya (1921–1989), playwright, lyric writer and story writer in Telugu cinema
Atreya (Devanagari:आत्रेय), ancient Rishi descended from Atri
Atreya (surname), Indo-Nepalese Hindu patronymic surname 
 Dattatreya, a Hindu deity encompassing the trinity of Brahma, Vishnu and Shiva